Paraswammerdamia albicapitella is a moth of the  family Yponomeutidae. It is found in most of Europe, except the western part of the Balkan Peninsula, Ukraine, Lithuania and Latvia. It was recently reported from Canada (British Columbia).

The wingspan is 10–13 mm. Adults are greyish with a white head and thorax. They are on wing in July.

The larvae feed on Prunus spinosa. They initially mine the leaves of their host plant. After overwintering in a silken enclosure, they feed freely on the leaves from within a silk web. Mining larvae can be found in September. The larvae have a reddish-brown body and light brown head.

References

Moths described in 1805
Yponomeutidae
Moths of Europe